Marcello Rodríguez Pons (born 24 August 1965) is an Argentine architect and sailor.

Early years
Marcello Rodriguez Pons was born in the city of Córdoba, Argentina. Part of his professional work during the first years was of a conceptual nature, and gradually, as the years passed, his ideas materialised into concrete projects.
Designer from everyday products such as chairs, tables, books and wine labels to hotels and  masterplans of new cities (see his MASTERPLAN  book). Son of a German mother and an Argentinian father, he did his elementary schooling at Academia Arguello, in his home town. He developed his first experiences in design at architectural firms while he studied architecture at the National University of Córdoba In 1994, he formed a small architectural firm, and in 2000 he completed his master's degree in Architectural and Urban Design at the same university in Argentina. He moved to Malaga, Spain, where he worked at HCP Architecture & Engineering, from 2002 and until 2011. 
In 2012 he opened his own architecture office Rodriguez Pons & Partners.

His main activity as an architect is based on the development of Master Plans for communities all over the world, and the design buildings in a contemporary style, taking special care on spaces, envelopes and how light affects them. Sunlight is in his projects controlled by a series of layers that constitute, in many cases, the outer “Wood & White” envelope system as he calls it, which includes balconies as sunshades, blinds, plus other natural and/or artificial elements on the façades, to achieve energy efficiency and sustainability. In the interior design of his projects, as well as in the products and furniture designs he also uses the “Wood & White” design style, often with the addition of black, gray and/or bricks.

Works and Projects

One of his first relevant projects was the Punta Jabali Winery (designed in 2014) which presented the opportunity to look at the winery as a building type, using the topography of the site to aid the winemaking process, and to create the optimum natural working conditions, while reducing the building's energy demands and its impact on the landscape. The Winery is oriented on a north-south axis, using the site inclination to allow grapes to enter the building by gravity. Grape access is a key space in wine making; a covered external space was created in order for the grapes to be selected manually. The building's levels expresses the main stages of production: fermentation in steel vats; ageing in oak barrels; and maturation in bottles; at the highest level we designed an operations hub, from which all stages of the production process can be controlled. The upper volume of the building emerges from the land, wanting to be the business card of the winery. It is clearly expressing the values that prevail in the project. The building enjoys natural light through an oversized fully openable window, views into the vineyard and a direct connection to the Barrel Hall and Cellar underground. Lined with slats from recycled wine barrels, the public areas evoke the rich tradition of winemaking in the region.

The Olympic Sports Initiation Center (designed in 2015) is a low rise development located inside a bigger master plan at the called Cidade Esportiva da Baixada Fluminense in Rio de Janeiro, Brazil. This 30-hectare master plan, also designed by Rodriguez Pons & Partners, includes, a sports center, residential units, school, retail, native forests, lagoons and the Brazilian Volunteer Firefighters Brigade. The sports buildings have a clean and tensioned silhouette with which the white horizontal lines of the grades and the curve of the grades-roof contrast with the vertical sun protection wooden blinds of the Indoor Arena, and the Aquatics Stadium. All of it clearly reflects his personal “Wood & White” design style. Between all these buildings, a multipurpose open air plaza joins them with the parking areas and the rest of the sports fields "connected" by large overhangs, canopies, fountains and ramps.

Millennium Casino & Resort (designed in 2011) and the Central District  building in it, was designed in the city of Fier, Albania, a 500-hectare master plan which includes two of the highest multi-use towers in Europe which rise up to +400 m. These towers have an elliptical faceted exoskeleton design for the buildings layout providing both gravity and lateral resistance for the building. The structural exoskeleton diagrid system creates an open, column-free environment. With spans between diagrid nodes of over fifteen meters, views to the three golf courses and the 500 yachts marina from the interior are expansive. In order to maintain purely axial loads in the elliptical form, diagrid members are constructed from straight, rather than curving segments which make them more cost effective among other sustainable design solutions.

Previously as project director at HCP Architecture and Engineering he designed the People Square Towers in the city of Hefei, China, a multifunctional complex that features a surrounding structure in the form of "scales" that fulfil the double function of supporting the structure and acting as a filter for the sunlight, making it a project with one of the highest levels of sustainability. On the island of Bahrain in the Persian Gulf, Amwaj Park District is a project with a "skin" featuring horizontal aluminium strips that provide dynamism and unity to the whole complex, which is located on an artificial manmade island. Among his Master Plan projects, Alcaidesa Universidad del Golf in Spain and Dannat Resort in Khobar, Saudi Arabia stand out on account of their gentle shapes that merge firmly and harmoniously into their respective environments, in them, he did his first studies of what he later called his “Wood & White” personal image design style.

Publications
2019 – Bienes Raices Magazine, Buenos Aires – Balance and Contrasts in 4 Scales of Design 
2017 – Rodriguez Pons, speaker at the Congress of Architects Argentina 2017 – Sheraton Hotel Cordoba 
2017 – Book presentation: Arquitectos Argentinos en el Mundo Bis 2017 – presentation & event video 
2017 – Book participation: Arquitectos Argentinos en el Mundo Bis 2017  author Daniel Casoy
2017 – Book presentation: at the Museo Emilio Caraffa of the book MASTERPLAN - Designs of a new way of living, and the “drawings” of Marcello Rodriguez Pons 
2017 – Book author: MASTERPLAN - Designs of a new way of living, author Marcello Rodriguez Pons
2016 – Design Seminar Series at Miromar Design Center – Naples, USA
2015 – La Voz del Interior, Cordoba – Argentine architects admired in the World 
2015 – La Nacion – Un arquitecto cordobés competirá con los mejores del mundo en Dubai 
2014 – ARQ Clarin – Premio internacional para un estudio cordobés 
2012 – Illyria Newspaper, New York – Aiming for elegant and efficient buildings to grace cities around the world – Interview with Marcello Rodriguez Pons
2010 – AV Proyectos – No. 38 – Solar Decathlon
2010 – Arquitectura Viva – Nº129 – Shanghai
2009 – CEO Middle East – No. 11 – Full Throttle
2009 – Arabian Business, Creativity Counts

Architecture Awards
First Prize at Cityscape Global Awards Dubai, UAE 2017 

Awarded 4 times a Highly Recommendation Award at Cityscape Global Awards Dubai, UAE (2011, 2012, 2014 & 2015)

First Prize Awarded 4 times by the World Architecture Community in New York, USA (2013, 2014, 2016 & 2017)

First Prize at the World Architecture Community Awards 2017 – 25th Cycle Winner

First Prize at the World Architecture Community Awards 2016 – 22nd Cycle Winner

First Prize at the World Architecture Community Awards 2014 – 15th Cycle Winner

First Prize at the World Architecture Community Awards 2013 – 13th Cycle Winner

First Prize at the Windsurfing World Championships 1990 - Division II Lightweight Category, Buenos Aires, Argentina

Sports Awards
Marcello Rodriguez Pons has represented Argentina eight times in Sailing World Championships in different classes of windsurfing and sailing boats; he was among the World Top 10 on four occasions: Buenos Aires 1990, Puerto Sherry 2006, Puerto de Santa Maria 2009 and Mar Chiquita 2014.
He won the Gold Medal at the 1990 Windsurf World Championships in the Division II Lightweight, in Buenos Aires, Argentina

References

External links
 Rodriguez Pons & Partners
 World Architecture Community Awards - 13th Cycle Winner
 ARQ Clarin – Torres Siva en Albania
 Arabian Business Magazine – Creativity Counts
 Cityscape Awards
 Linked in Profile
 Architizer Profile
 HCP Architecture & Engineering
 ISAF - 6th place Windsurf World Championship 2009 Cadiz, Spain in the Formula Experience Category
 

1965 births
Living people
Argentine architects
Argentine male sailors (sport)
People from Córdoba Province, Argentina